Polytan GmbH is a German manufacturer of synthetic turf systems and synthetic sport surfaces. It is based in Burgheim, Bavaria, and is a subsidiary of Sport Group Holding.

Company history
 
Polytan was founded in 1970 as Firl + Schretter Sportstättenbau in Neuburg an der Donau and, initially, installed polyurethane-bound in-situ synthetic surfaces for sports facilities.
 
In 1995, Polytan started to develop synthetic turf systems and acquired a production facility for synthetic turf and polyurethane in Grefrath (North Rhine-Westfalia).
 
In 2003, a coating and extrusion plant for synthetic turf was installed at the production facility in Grefrath. In the same year, the company acquired a FIFA license to be able to provide turfs for official games.
 
Since ECHA has proposed a ban on the synthetic application of microplastics, which is still being discussed by the EU Commission, in 2020, Polytan has started to develop and install sustainable tracks and turf systems made from recycled materials and Brazilian sugarcane.

Products 
Polytan manufactures, distributes and installs high-speed tracks, all-weather courts, tennis courts and shock-absorbent surfaces, as well as synthetic turf systems and multifunctional playing fields.

Company Structure 
Polytan GmbH is a wholly owned subsidiary of Sport Group Holding. The managing director of Polytan GmbH is Friedemann Söll (since November 9, 2021).
 
Polytan's headquarters are in Burgheim, with additional locations in Berlin and Halle. The production facility is in Grefrath, Germany. The production company is a subsidiary called Polytex.
 
Polytan has 291 employees (as of 2021).

References

 

Companies based in Bavaria
Neuburg-Schrobenhausen
Artificial turf
German companies established in 1969